Grue Stadion is a municipal multi-purpose stadium located in Kirkenær in Grue, Norway. It opened in 1975 and is home to Grue IL. The stadium's peak attendance of between 4,000 and 5,000 dates from 1975 and 1976, when the team played in the Second Division. In 1990, Kongsvinger played a single match in the First Division at Grue Stadion. The venue hosted a Norway national under-21 football team match once, on 17 August 1977, when Norway beat Finland 1–0.

References

Football venues in Norway
Eliteserien venues
Athletics (track and field) venues in Norway
Sports venues in Innlandet
Grue, Norway
1975 establishments in Norway
Sports venues completed in 1975